The Rogers Reds (also known as the Lions, Cardinals and the Rustlers) were a minor league baseball team that represented Rogers, Arkansas in the Arkansas–Missouri League and Arkansas State League from 1934 to 1938.

References
Baseball Reference

Baseball teams established in 1934
Baseball teams disestablished in 1938
Defunct Arkansas State League teams
Professional baseball teams in Arkansas
Cincinnati Reds minor league affiliates
Defunct minor league baseball teams
1938 establishments in Arkansas
1938 disestablishments in Arkansas
Defunct baseball teams in Arkansas